Terminus Voyageur may refer to: 

Gare d'autocars de Montréal, formerly Terminus d'autocars Voyageur
Ottawa Central Station, formerly Voyageur motorcoach Terminus

See also
 Voyageur (disambiguation)